Boston City Council elections were held on November 6, 2007. Eight seats (four district representatives and four at-large members) were contested in the general election, as the incumbents in districts 1, 2, 5, 6, and 8 were unopposed. Two seats (districts 7 and 9) had also been contested in the preliminary election held on September 25, 2007.

At-large
Councillors Michael F. Flaherty, Stephen J. Murphy, and Sam Yoon were re-elected, while incumbent Felix D. Arroyo was beaten for the final seat by John R. Connolly.

District 1
Councillor Salvatore LaMattina ran unopposed and was re-elected.

District 2
Councillor Bill Linehan ran unopposed and was re-elected.

District 3
Councillor Maureen Feeney was re-elected.

District 4
Councillor Charles Yancey was re-elected.

District 5
Councillor Robert Consalvo ran unopposed and was re-elected.

District 6
Councillor John M. Tobin Jr. ran unopposed and was re-elected.

District 7
Councillor Chuck Turner was re-elected.

 write-in votes

District 8
Councillor Michael P. Ross ran unopposed and was re-elected.

District 9
The seat formerly held by Jerry P. McDermott was won by Mark Ciommo. McDermott had announced in May 2007 that he would not seek re-election.

See also
 List of members of Boston City Council

References

Further reading

External links
 2007 Election Results at boston.gov

City Council election
Boston City Council elections
Boston City Council election
Boston City Council